Colignan is a small rural town on the banks of the Murray River, in North Western Victoria, Australia. The town is on the border of the Hattah-Kulkyne National Park. At the 2016 census, Colignan and the surrounding area had a population of 329.

The closest town to Colignan is called Nangiloc which is Colignan spelt in reverse. It appears that Colignan predated Nangiloc, and Colignan is thought to have been the name of a local Aboriginal leader.

History
Colignan and nearby localities Nangiloc and Iraak were established as soldier settlement farming areas after World War I, road access to the area being from the west via Boonoonar on what is now the Calder Highway. A Post Office opened on August 22, 1922, marking the beginning of postal services to the area. It closed in 1988.

In common with many other soldier settlement areas the blocks provided were too small to be viable and most original settlers had left by the mid-1930s and were replaced by a later generation using irrigation.

The town today
The economy of the town is based on primary industry, mostly citrus and grape growing. Avocados and almonds are also well represented. The rich soil and the proximity to the Murray River have allowed farming of a diverse range of crops. Dry land farming in the area consists of mainly wheat and barley.

See also
 1956 Murray River flood

References

Towns in Victoria (Australia)
Populated places on the Murray River
Mallee (Victoria)
Australian soldier settlements
1922 establishments in Australia